Sassia nassariformis is a species of predatory sea snail, a marine gastropod mollusk in the family Cymatiidae.

Description

Distribution
This marine species occurs in the Mozambique Channel.

References

 Steyn, D.G & Lussi, M. (2005). Offshore Shells of Southern Africa: A pictorial guide to more than 750 Gastropods. Published by the authors. Pp. i–vi, 1–289.

Cymatiidae